Star people may refer to:
 Native American culture
 Star people (Native American belief), name given to astral beings who visited various Native American tribes.

 Extraterrestrial life
 Star people (New Age), individuals who believe they might have originated from another world, dimension, or planet

Literature
 The Eldar, an elven race in J. R. R. Tolkien's Sundering of the Elves
 Star People, mythological creatures from the fantasy Narnia world of C. S. Lewis
 Star People, a 2006 novel by Paul Burston

Music
 Star People, a 1983 album by Miles Davis
 Star People, a 1996 song on the Older album by George Michael
 Star People, a 2002(?) album by Brulé
 Star People, a music record label